Dale Bokingo Corvera is a Filipino politician from the province of Agusan del Norte, Philippines. Also the elected member of the World Organization of the Scout Movement, Asia Pacific Regional Committee and currently the National President of the Boy Scouts of the Philippines. Elected as Governor of the province in 2019. He served as City Mayor of Cabadbaran, Agusan del Norte from 2007 to 2016, Vice Governor of the same Province from 2004-2007, Board Member from 1995-2004 and Municipal Councilor from 1992-1995.

References

External links
Province of Agusan del Norte Official Website

Living people
People from Agusan del Norte
PDP–Laban politicians
Year of birth missing (living people)